The Golfo San Jorge Basin is a hydrocarbon-rich sedimentary basin located in eastern Patagonia, Argentina. The basin covers the entire San Jorge Gulf and an inland area west of it, having one half located in Santa Cruz Province and the other in Chubut Province. The northern boundary of the basin is the North Patagonian Massif while the Deseado Massif forms the southern boundary of the basin. The basin has largely developed under condition of extensional tectonics, including rifting.

The basin is of paleontological significance as it hosts six out of 22 defining formations for the SALMA classification, the geochronology for the Cenozoic used in South America.

Oil was first discovered in 1907 and over the years it has become the second most productive hydrocarbon basin in Argentina after Neuquén Basin.

Stratigraphy 
The stratigraphy of the Golfo San Jorge Basin covers the following units:

See also 
 Cañadón Asfalto Basin
 Magallanes Basin
 South American land mammal ages

References

Bibliography 
General
 

Cretaceous

Paleogene 
Andesitas Huancache Formation
 
 

Bororó Formation
 

Casamayor Formation
 
 

Las Flores Formation
 
 
 

Koluel Kaike Formation
 

Peñas Coloradas Formation
 
 

Río Chico Group
 

Salamanca Formation

Neogene 
Río Mayo Formation
 

Sarmiento Formation & Colhué Huapí Member

Further reading 
 
 
 

 
Sedimentary basins of Argentina
Rift basins
Geology of Chubut Province
Geology of Santa Cruz Province, Argentina
Mesozoic rifts and grabens